Italy–Malta relations are bilateral relations between Italy and Malta. Both countries established official diplomatic relations soon after Malta's independence. Both countries are members of the European Union, Organization for Security and Co-operation in Europe and Union for the Mediterranean.
Italy has given full support to Malta's membership of the European Union.

History

Pre-independence relations 
Malta and the Italian peninsula have a long history of relations given their proximity. Malta was part of the Normans' Kingdom of Sicily and remained associated with the Italian kingdom until 1194. The Kingdom of Naples would be involved in the war against the French occupation of the island. Italian language was the official language in Malta since the Knights Hospitaller until the British control. In 1800 Malta became a protectorate jointly administered by Naples and the United Kingdom, although the latter had more influence. By 1813 the island became a British colony and thus moved outside the Italian sphere, although the presence of Italian culture and language remained strong. Indeed, Italian designs on the island were highlighted in April 1933, when on a visit to the island, Italian cabinet undersecretary Francesco Giunta stated that he was on Italian soil and that the future of the island lay in complete union with Italy. The two countries clashed during World War II when Italy bombed the island during the Siege of Malta. Malta's rejection of Mussolini's fascism and Nazi support led to Italy bombing Malta for two years between 1940 and 1942.

Independent relations 

Italy was the first country to establish a diplomatic mission in Malta and the first to appoint a resident ambassador (since then resident at Villa Bel Air in Ta' Xbiex) after Malta achieved independence and became a full member of the UN. On December 1, 1964, that the first Italian ambassador presented his credentials to the governor general, Sir Maurice Dorman.

In 1980, Malta entered into a neutrality agreement with Italy, under which Malta agreed not to enter into any alliance and Italy agreed to guarantee Malta's neutrality. Malta's relations with Italy have been described as "generally excellent".

Diplomatic relations 
Italy has an embassy in Valletta. Malta has an embassy in Rome and 18 honorary consulates (in Bari, Bologna, Brescia, Cagliari, Catania, Genoa, Livorno, Milan, Naples, Palermo, Perugia, Reggio Calabria, Savona, Syracuse, Turin, Trieste, and Venice).

Historical notable persons in Italian-Maltese relations 
 Mattia Preti, painter
 Alberto Pullicino, painter
 Pietro Paolo Floriani, architect, after whom Floriana was named

Notable contemporary persons with double citizenship of Italy and Malta 
 Arnold Cassola, politician
 Aidan Zammit, musician
 Samuel Deguara, basketball player

See also 

 Foreign relations of Italy
 Foreign relations of Malta
 Italian irredentism in Malta 
 Accession of Malta to the European Union
 Malta–NATO relations
 European Union–NATO relations

References

External links
 Italian embassy in Valletta
 Directions of the Maltese representation in Italy
 Henry Frendo, Malta-Italy relations: then and now, Times of Malta, Sunday, July 21, 2002

 
Malta
Bilateral relations of Malta